Dublin South FM is a Community Radio station for South Dublin, which broadcasts seven days a week from 11am to 11pm on 93.9FM, and broadcasts 24 hours a day on digital.

The station is operated by a democratic co-operative, Dublin South FM Co-Op, and is open to all individuals and organisations in South Dublin.
Over 70 volunteers produce and broadcast 84 hours of programmes each week from its studios in Dundrum Town Centre.

The station focuses on local news and current affairs with an emphasis on supporting community development, and provides a platform to a wide range of local groups in the Dun Laoghaire-Rathdown area. The station also broadcasts a wide range of specialist music programmes (Jazz, Soul, Country, Reggae, Rock etc.) and also features History, Arts, Foreign language, Business programmes and Documentaries.

Dublin South FM is Dublin's first Community Radio station to be licensed and regulated by the Broadcasting Authority of Ireland.

History
Dublin South FM, formerly DSCR (Dublin South Community Radio), was formed by the Churchtown Residents Association in 1982 and started broadcasting from a premises off Main Street, Dundrum, before moving to the local Holy Cross School. It was affiliated with the National Association of Community Broadcasters, the precursor to CRAOL. It registered as a Co-op in 1985.

After almost ten years of negotiations, the Independent Radio and Television Commission (IRTC) finally issued advertisements for Community Radio licenses in 1994. After an oral hearing in November 1994, the IRTC board granted DSCR the first broadcast license for a Community Radio station in Dublin.

DSCR began broadcasting on 104.9 FM from the historic Pye Factory in Dundrum on 5 June 1995.

In December 2000, Dublin South Community Radio changed its name to Dublin South FM.

In December 2006 Dublin South FM was instructed to move its FM broadcast frequency to 93.9 FM by the BAI (then known as the Broadcasting Commission of Ireland), to make way for the now-defunct Phantom FM.

In September 2007 the station studios moved to its current location in the new Dundrum Town Centre.

In 2011 the station increased its daily broadcasting output from 4 - 9 pm to 11 am to 11 pm.

To mark the station's 25th birthday as a licensed broadcaster, Dublin South FM began broadcasting 24/7 online on 5 June 2020.

Staff
The station is managed by a team of producers, production assistants, and marketing staff with support from the Dublin South FM Board.

References

External links
DublinSouthFM.com Homepage 
Dublin South FM Programme Schedule
CRAOL
Broadcasting Authority of Ireland

Mass media in Dublin (city)
Radio stations in the Republic of Ireland